Borstrondi or Skulestadmoen is a village in Voss municipality in Vestland county, Norway.

References

Villages in Vestland
Voss